Alexander Henry O’Neil  (23 July 1907 – 21 October 1997) was the 5th Bishop of Fredericton and later the 13th  Metropolitan of Canada.He was educated at The University of Western Ontario  and  ordained in 1930. He was Principal at Huron College then General Secretary of The British and Foreign Bible Society. He was consecrated Bishop on  25 January 1957 and became  Metropolitan of  Canada in 1963; and retired from both posts in 1971.

Notes

1907 births
People from Warwick
University of Manitoba alumni
Anglican bishops of Fredericton
20th-century Anglican Church of Canada bishops
Metropolitans of Canada
20th-century Anglican archbishops
1997 deaths